David Carl Turnley (born June 22, 1955) is an American photographer, winner of the Pulitzer Prize, two World Press Photos of the Year, and the Robert Capa Award for Courage.

His twin brother Peter Turnley is also a photographer.

Life and career
David and Peter Turnley were born June 22, 1955, born to William Loyd Turnley and Elizabeth Ann Turnley (née Protsman) in Fort Wayne, Indiana. David Turnley studied French literature at the University of Michigan, where he earned a B.A. in 1977. A fluent speaker of French and Spanish, he also has studied at the Sorbonne and Harvard University.

Turnley won the 1990 Pulitzer Prize for photography for images of the political uprisings in China and Eastern Europe, the World Press Photo Picture of the Year in 1988 for a photo taken in Leninakan after the devastating Spitak earthquake and again in 1991 for a picture of a U.S. Sergeant mourning the death of a fellow soldier during the Gulf War, as well as the Overseas Press Club Robert Capa Gold Medal. He has been a runner-up for the Pulitzer Prize in photography four times.

From 1985 to 1997, Turnley covered the struggle to end Apartheid, revolutions in Eastern Europe, the student uprising in China, the Bosnian War and the Gulf war, and the fall of the Soviet Union. In addition to publishing numerous books, he has  directed an Emmy-nominated documentary for CNN on the Dalai Lama, and a feature-length documentary set in Cuban dance hall, La Tropical. He directed the documentary Shenandoah, released in 2012, about the 2008 murder and attempted cover up of an immigrant from Mexico by a group of local high school football stars from Shenandoah, Pennsylvania.

Turnley was one of the few photographers who were at the World Trade Center in New York City on September 11, 2001, and who went into the rubble with the very first firemen.

Turnley is father of two children and lives with his wife Rachel in Paris, France.

Books
 Jim Harbaugh, David Turnley: "Rise Again." Self-Published: Enthusiasm Productions LLC, 2017.
 Jim Harbaugh, David Turnley: "Enthusiasm Unknown to Mankind." Foster Park Publishing, 2016.
 David C. Turnley: Why Are They Weeping: South Africans Under Apartheid. Stewart, Tabori & Chang Inc, 1988, 
 David Turnley, Peter Turnley, Melinda Liu: Beijing Spring. Stewart, Tabori & Chang Inc, 1989, 
 David Turnley, Peter Turnley: Moments of Revolution: Eastern Europe. Stewart, Tabori & Chang Inc, 1990, 
 David C. Turnley, William Keller: The Russian Heart: Days of Crisis and Hope. Phaidon Press Ltd, 1992, 
 Howard Chapnick, David C. Turnley, Peter Turnley: In Times of War and Peace. Abbeville Press, 1997, 
 David Turnley: Baghdad Blues: A War Diary. Vendome Press, 2003, 
 John G. Morris, David Turnley, Peter Turnley: McClellan Street. Indiana Univ Press, 2007, 
 David Turnley: Mandela!: Struggle & Triumph: Struggle and Triumph. Harry N. Abrams, 2008,

References

External links
 David Turnley's Official Website
 David Turnley at the University of Michigan
 

1955 births
American photojournalists
Photography in Iraq
Photography in Russia
Photography in the Soviet Union
Pulitzer Prize for Feature Photography winners
University of Michigan College of Literature, Science, and the Arts alumni
University of Paris alumni
Harvard University alumni
Identical twins
Living people
American twins